Feasey is a surname. Notable people with the surname include:

Kirsty Feasey (born 1993), English-born Maltese footballer
Paul Feasey (1933–2012), British footballer
Willis Feasey (born 1992), New Zealand alpine ski racer

See also
 Vaisey
 Veasey

English-language surnames